Segni particolari: bellissimo (Distinguishing features: beautiful) is a 1983 Italian comedy film directed by Castellano & Pipolo. The film was a commercial success, grossing over 3,4 billion lire at the Italian box office.

Plot 
Mattia is a nice guy, famous writer, who is about to marry Rosalie. Mattia, the day before the wedding, goes to confession to the priest, and reveals that he is in love with another woman, younger, named Michela. Mattia says that the two, before the decision of marriage, lived happy, and when embarrassing situations threatened to discover people the truth about Michela, Mattia used the excuse that she is his daughter. When the wedding are now celebrating, in church bursts Michela, and Mattia escapes away with her.

Cast 
Adriano Celentano: Mattia
Federica Moro: Michela
Gianni Bonagura: Professor  
Silvio Spaccesi: Priest
Tiberio Murgia: Saruzzo 
Anna Kanakis: Rosalia
Simona Mariani: Lidia

References

External links

1983 films
Italian comedy films
1983 comedy films
Films directed by Castellano & Pipolo
1980s Italian films